Eucereon leucophaea is a moth of the subfamily Arctiinae. It was described by Francis Walker in 1855. It is found in the Brazilian states of Rio de Janeiro and São Paulo. Its status is not considered threatened.

References

 

leucophaea
Moths described in 1855
Moths of South America